The 1983–84 FA Trophy was the fifteenth season of the FA Trophy. The final was held at Wembley Stadium, with a replay being played at Stoke City's Victoria Ground.

Preliminary round

Ties

Replays

First qualifying round

Ties

Replays

2nd replay

Second qualifying round

Ties

Replays

2nd replays

Third qualifying round

Ties

Replays

2nd replays

1st round
The teams that given byes to this round are Telford United, Enfield, Maidstone United, Wealdstone, Runcorn, Boston United, Weymouth, Northwich Victoria, Scarborough, Bath City, Nuneaton Borough, Altrincham, Bangor City, Dagenham, Worcester City, Kidderminster Harriers, Gateshead, Barrow, Dartford, Bishop's Stortford, Wycombe Wanderers, Blyth Spartans, Mossley, Sutton United, Slough Town, Leytonstone Ilford, Bishop Auckland, A P Leamington, Chorley, Harrow Borough, Croydon and Whitby Town.

Ties

Replays

2nd round

Ties

Replays

2nd replay

3rd round

Ties

Replays

2nd replay

4th round

Ties

Replays

Semi finals

First leg

Second leg

Final

Tie

Replay

References

General
 Football Club History Database: FA Trophy 1983–84

Specific

1983–84 domestic association football cups
League
1983-84